Lacordaire is a surname. Notable people with the surname include:

Jean Théodore Lacordaire (1801–1870), Belgian entomologist
Jean-Baptiste Henri Lacordaire (1802–1861), French preacher

See also
Colegio Lacordaire
Lacordaire Academy